Mabel Ruth Baker was a state legislator in Colorado. She served multiple terms. She was a sponsor of education bills including the requirement of an oath to be taken by teachers and for teacher pay. A Republican, she lived in Denver.

References

20th-century American women politicians
20th-century American politicians
Republican Party members of the Colorado House of Representatives
Politicians from Denver
Year of birth missing
Year of death missing